Artyom Andreyevich Pasko (born 3 April 1992) is a Russian professional football player. He plays for FC Tyumen.

Club career
He made his Russian Football National League debut for FC Baltika Kaliningrad on 7 September 2014 in a game against PFC Krylia Sovetov Samara.

External links
 
 

1992 births
Living people
Russian footballers
Association football midfielders
FC Dynamo Kirov players
FC Baltika Kaliningrad players
FC Volga Nizhny Novgorod players
FC Sokol Saratov players
FC Dynamo Saint Petersburg players
FC Rubin Kazan players
FC Zenit-Izhevsk players
FC Irtysh Omsk players
FC Tyumen players
Russian First League players
Russian Second League players